Brunapeg is a settlement in the Matabeleland South Province of Zimbabwe. It is one of the urban centres in Mangwe District, one of the seven administrative districts in the province.

Location
Brunapeg is located in the extreme south west of Zimbabwe, close to the international border with Botswana.

The geographical coordinates of Brunapeg are: 21°09'45.0"S, 28°01'40.0"E (Latitude:-21.162500; Longitude:28.027778).

Overview
The town hosts St Annes Roman Catholic Mission. The mission owns and operates St Annes Mission Hospital. The mission was established in 1954. The mission also runs an affiliated nursing school, which graduates approximately 25 nurses every year. The mission also owns and runs a primary school.

Economy
Businesses in the town include gas stations, grocery stores, hardware shops, restaurants, a food distribution center and a post office. The local vegetation supports the growth of  Gonimbrasia belina worms. The worms are locally known as Macimbi or Mahonja. The worm feeds on mopane tree leaves, although the diet is not restricted to this tree. The worms are exported to Botswana and some are transported to the city of Bulawayo for distribution throughout Zimbabwe. They are a human food delicacy in most countries of Southern Africa.

Transport

Politics 
Present-day Brunapeg as a singular entity can be seen as fairly liberal, in the 2004 parliamentary election. Fifty eight percent voted for the Movement for Democratic Change. Edward Tshotsho Moyo Mkhosi (MDC) received 10,145 votes; Eunice Nomthandazo Moyo (ZANU-PF) received 5,723 votes. However the MDC lost the largely boycotted Senate election of 2005.

Neighborhoods
Brunapeg has many vibrant neighborhoods. Major villages around the town centre include: 1. Phathisani 2. Newline and 3. Oldline. These neighborhoods are administratively classified as Ward 7 in the Mangwe Rural District Council, under whose jurisdiction Brunapeg lies.

Demographics 
Most people in the area are of Kalanga descent, and there is a number of Ndebele and because of its proximity with Botswana there are also Motswana people and  Shona people
. There is a sizeable population of labor immigrants from neighboring countries, including South Africa, Botswana, Malawi and Zambia.

See also
 Colleen Bawn

References

External links
 SK Mourns Plumtree Accident Victims As of 13 August 2019.

Mangwe District 
Populated places in Matabeleland South Province